Lopinga deidamia is a species of butterfly in the family Nymphalidae. It is found from the Urals to southern Siberia, China, Mongolia, Korea and Japan.

Description
The wingspan is 45–55 mm. Seitz describes it thus-P. deidamia Ev. (menetriesi Brem.) (45 f). The male above somewhat similar to the menara male, the female with white spots proximally to as well as below the apical ocellus: both sexes recognizable by the underside, which is dark blackish brown and without the dentate hues found in the megera- maera -groups of
forms. Very widely distributed, from the Ural throughout Asia, Siberia, Tibet. China and Japan. — In Korea occurs the dark form erebina Btlr., which is characterized by the more pointed forewing and strongly enlarged apical ocellus. — More singly, in some countries restricted to mountainous districts, the insect flying under trees and on road-sides, settling at puddles, the flight being weak and lazy. In the south of its area in May and again from August onward , in certain districts of China and in Amurland in July:usually rare. As in the case of maera a whole series of special forms might be separated in accordance with locality and season.

Biology
Adults are on wing from June to August in one or two generations per year.

The larvae feed on Agrostis, Calamagrostis and Elytrigia species.

Subspecies
Lopinga deidamia deidamia
Lopinga deidamia erebina Butler, 1883 (Amur, Ussuri)
Lopinga deidamia sachalinensis Matsumura, 1911 (Sakhalin)
Lopinga deidamia interrupta Fruhstorfer, 1909
Lopinga deidamia kampuzana Y. Yamazaki, 1981

References

Butterflies described in 1851
Lopinga
Taxa named by Eduard Friedrich Eversmann